Dulay Rasheed (Arabic: ضليع رشيد) is a city in the center of Saudi Arabia.
The city recorded a population of about 35,000 according to the 2010 national census. with a density of about 25 people per km2.
The city has many official sub-governorates and villages.

Geography

Location 
Dulay Rasheed is located in the center of Saudi Arabia and is part of Al-Qassim Region.
The coordinates of the city are 25°31'27" N and 42°51'48" E in DMS (Degrees Minutes Seconds) or 25.5242 and 42.8633 (in decimal degrees). Its UTM position is KP82 and its Joint Operation Graphics reference is NG38-09.

Climate
Dulay Rasheed's climate is warm with an average temperature of 27°. The hottest month is August at 36° and the coolest is January at 14°

References 

Populated places in Al-Qassim Province